EVBox is an electric vehicle supply equipment company based in Amsterdam, Netherlands. Founded in 2010 by Bram van der Leur and Huub Rothengatter. It currently has 13 offices around the world, including Amsterdam, Antwerp, Bordeaux, Copenhagen, Libertyville, Madrid, Milton Keynes, Munich, New York City, Oslo, Paris, Rotterdam, and Warsaw. EVBox manufactures and distributes electric vehicle (EV) charging stations and charging management software. As of December 2020, it has a global installed base of over 190,000 charging points.

Company 

EVBox Group is a provider of chargers for electric vehicles (EVs). Founded in 2010, EVBox started when the movement for EVs took off. In 2014, Gilde Equity Management Benelux became EVBox's new major shareholder to help EVBox expand internationally. In 2017, EVBox was acquired by ENGIE Digital, a subset of French multinational electric utility company Engie. In July 2018, EVBox acquired French fast charging manufacturer, EVTronic.

Products 
EVBox's product portfolio includes hardware (charging stations and accessories), software (charging management system) and services (maintenance and mobility services).

Hardware 
EVBox currently offers both AC and DC charging stations:
 EVBox Elvi (a home charging station for electric vehicle drivers with private and lease cars)
 EVBox Livo (a smart charger for electric vehicle drivers who want to charge at home)
 EVBox BusinessLine (for business owners in offices, retail and hospitality locations)
 EVBox Iqon (a workplace and commercial charging station intended for North America and Europe)
 EVBox Troniq Modular (a fast-charging station capable of charging up to 240 kW intended for highway and commercial use)

Software 
EVBox currently offers access to their charging management software EVBox Everon that helps businesses and individuals track, manage, and optimize electric car charging.

In 2017, the company announced the launch of Everon, a Platform-as-a-Service (PaaS) charging management tool that enables businesses and municipalities to facilitate the experience of electric vehicle charging.

Partners 
EVBox uses an indirect approach to distributing their products. EVBox partners with network providers, EVSE experts, electrical equipment companies, and key companies from various industries to provide charging infrastructure for cities, enterprises, and residents. These companies include ENGIE, Rexel, Vattenfall, Eneco, and many others.

Through joint partnerships, EVBox also provides cities around the world with charging infrastructure, such as Amsterdam (with Vattenfall and Heijmans), Rotterdam (with ENGIE), Monaco, and New York State (with EVConnect).

Awards 
In 2016, EVBox was ranked 22nd in the Deloitte Technology Fast 50 in the Netherlands and was awarded 1st place in the CleanTech sector. It made its mark with a growth rate of 466% over the previous three years.

In 2017, EVBox was named a Grid Edge Award winner by Greentech Media and highlighted as an industry leader focused on paving the way towards tomorrow's distributed energy systems.

In 2018, EVBox was named a CES Innovations Award Honoree in the category of Smart Energy with the Elvi product. Later that year, it was also featured on the Inc. 5000 Europe List of fastest-growing private companies, alongside companies like Intuit, Timberland, and Microsoft.

In 2019, EVBox was named as a leading provider of Public Charging Network and EV Charging Services by Navigant Research. Later in 2019, EVBox won a CES Innovations Award, a iF Design Award, and a Red Dot Award with EVBox Iqon.

See also 
Charging stations
Electric vehicle
Electric vehicle infrastructure
ChargePoint

References 

Information technology companies of the Netherlands
Manufacturing companies based in Amsterdam
2010 establishments in the Netherlands
Electric vehicle technologies